The Gay Lady may refer to:

The Gay Lady (1929 film), American musical, directed by Robert Florey and starring Gertrude Lawrence
The Gay Lady (1935 film), British title for American film Lady Tubbs, directed by Alan Crosland and starring Alice Brady
The Gay Lady (1949 film), American title for British film Trottie True, directed by Brian Desmond Hurst and starring Jean Kent